Nikhil Sahni also known as DJ NYK is an Indian DJ, music producer, radio host, VJ, music career coach, and label owner at Play Life records. He is widely known for his Bollywood remixes, mashups, and his live sets in locations like Lake Pichola and Kerala backwaters.

Early life 
Born and raised in New Delhi, India, DJ NYK completed his education from Delhi University and started his journey in the clubs of the Indian capital. He was influenced by music at an early age and started producing songs as well as remixes in high school before getting into DJing.

Career 
DJ NYK started DJing in 2003 and he got his first job as a resident DJ at Club Moets in New Delhi in 2004. While he continued to resident at other clubs in the city as well, he simultaneously worked on producing remixes, which he kept uploading on the internet on two popular music platforms called coolgoose.com & djluv.in. DJ NYK landed his first professional gig at the age of 20. His big break came in 2006 when an organiser in Hong Kong invited him to perform as a guest DJ for their event. Soon after, two more remixes went viral on the internet; Maula Mere and Ya Ali – caught the attention of DJ Aqeel, who praised his work and invited him to play at club POISON in Mumbai. Thereon, DJ NYK has gone on to headline thousands of events across India and the globe, performing in over 63 cities worldwide; and successfully commissioning multiple international tours across Middle East, South East Asia, Europe, Australia, and New Zealand to name a few.

Through the Electronyk Show, NYK asserted himself as the first artist to introduce Video-DJ’ing (VDJ’ing) in India.

His incursion into Bollywood was one of the principal breakthroughs in his career when he did a remix for Shah Rukh Khan starrer "Billu". Since then, he has commissioned several official remixes for over 20 different Bollywood films. NYK has also done official mixes for Danish Pop duo Bombay Rockers and Nindy Kaur. His official remix of Aye Khuda from the movie "Paathshaala" was no.1 position on the domestic radio charts. NYK's remix of the hit track " Chammak Challo" sung by international pop star Akon was featured on Ra.One's PlayStation, which made him first Indian DJ to REMIX a track for PlayStation video game.

DJ NYK hosted his own radio show called 'Rock The Party' on 94.3 MY FM back in 2011 and then another show, 'Saturday Night Fever with DJ NYK' on Fever 104 FM that aired pan India in 2018 and 2019.

NYK’s first official international remix – “Haze” – was released on Gold Records (Canada), and drew support from international superstar Gareth Emery who featured it on his weekly podcast. His original productions have been released internationally on Progressive Groove Records (Canada), Pearlicks Records (Miami), and LAD Records; and have also been aired and featured prominently on the BBC Asian Network .

DJ NYK also performed alongside Salman Khan , Kriti Sanon , Sonakshi Sinha , Daisy Shah , and Prabhu Deva for their Dabangg Tour concert in New Delhi. He also played at the Club MTV party and MTV Bollyland in India.

His official remix of the 2018 chartbuster “Kya Baat Ay” by Harrdy won him acclaim across several digital streaming platforms including Saavn where the track received over 1 million streams.

On 24th December 2021, DJ NYK performed at Dubai Expo 2020 held at the Dubai Millennium Amphitheatre.

Electronyk Podcast 
Launched in the year 2009, the Electronyk Podcast is NYK’s endeavour based on his principle of “Music Beyond Genres”. The podcast essentially started off as a mixtape of music and sounds from across India and the world. Every episode of the Electronyk Podcast features a compilation of some of the best in Bollywood and Electronic Dance Music that have been hand-picked by Nikhil himself; and these include his own exclusive remixes in addition to renditions by other up-coming producers and chart topping international dance music hits. The release of the milestone 10th episode of the Electronyk Podcast took place in February 2015 which celebrated 5 successful years. #ElectronykPodcast11 claimed the #1 spot on iTunes and Twitter’s trending list, whereas Episode 13 reached over a million viewers through its Facebook Live Broadcast. As of February 2020 the Electronyk Podcast has completed 10 glorious years spanning over 16 episodes.

Electronyk Academy 
Established in 2011, NYK set up the Electronyk Academy in New Delhi to impart world class, cutting edge electronic music education to students in a congenial and comfortable studio environment; and to build a community of musicians, DJs, visual artists, audio professionals and enthusiasts of all genres who share a genuine passion for music.

NYK’s Electronyk Academy offers courses in DJ’ing, music production and DVJ’ing that emphasize quality learning of software and hardware essentials, and through this, NYK aims to give back to the industry by helping to shape the future generation of DJs, producers and DVJs

Play Life Podcast 
The Play Life Podcast comes with 90 minutes of fresh electronic music, exploring homegrown talent – aspiring and established Indian electronic music artists. The Guest Mix section features established Indian and International electronic music artists sharing their latest sets which span over 30 minutes. To this, Nikhil adds in his own unique musical contributions. Since its inception in 2016 the podcast has received adulation, love and support from listeners in 112 countries, while being graced by some of the biggest superstar DJs on the planet like Steve Aoki, KSHMR, Nicky Romero, Timmy Trumpet, Mike Williams, Nervo, Fedde Le Grand, Kura, Quintino, and Bass Jackers.

Play Life Records 
Play Life Records scouts for those talented Indian music producers making original electronic music, and provides them a platform & feature their music worldwide on all the major online music stores like iTunes, Spotify  etc. This comes as an effort to provide adequate support to both rising & established artists of the Indian electronic music scene. NYK himself has released three original compositions dear to his heart - “Living Kings”, “Wild Horses” and “Remember You”. A total of 20 releases on the label so far.

Discography

Original Singles

Bollywood Remixes

Pop/Indie Remixes

Awards and Endorsements 
In 2009, global DJ gear leader Pioneer announced NYK as their official DJ and brand ambassador in India. NYK is also the official brand ambassador in India for industry leading brands like V-Moda, Antelope Audio, Ultrasone and Ultracoustic, in addition to lifestyle and luxury brands like Daniel Wellington and Tiktauli De Corps.

Also, Nikhil is the only Indian DJ to be voted and awarded India’s Best Bollywood DJ 3 Times at the VH1 MyFav Awards; in 2012, 2013, and 2016 respectively. In 2014, he was inducted into the awards’ All Star/Legends category.

References 

Year of birth missing (living people)
Indian DJs
Indian producers
Living people
Musicians from Delhi